Louis Marcus (January 6, 1880 – July 6, 1936) was an American politician who served as the 23rd mayor of Salt Lake City from 1931 to 1936. Outside of politics, Marcus was also a prominent Idaho and Utah theater operator. , Marcus is the only Jewish mayor in the city's -year history. He served as mayor until his death on July 6, 1936. He is buried in the Salt Lake City Cemetery.

References

External links 

1880 births
Jewish American people in Utah politics
Jewish mayors of places in the United States
Jews and Judaism in Utah
Mayors of Salt Lake City
1936 deaths
Burials at Salt Lake City Cemetery
20th-century American politicians
Utah Republicans